Bondurant is a census-designated place (CDP) in Sublette County, Wyoming, United States. The population was 93 at the 2010 census. The town was named after B. F. Bondurant.

Demographics
As of the census of 2000, there were 155 people, 75 households, and 45 families residing in the CDP. The population density was 2.0 people per square mile (0.8/km2). There were 128 housing units at an average density of 1.6/sq mi (0.6/km2). The racial makeup of the CDP was 98.06% White, 1.94% from other races. Hispanic or Latino of any race were 4.52% of the population.

There were 75 households, out of which 18.7% had children under the age of 18 living with them, 54.7% were married couples living together, and 38.7% were non-families. 32.0% of all households were made up of individuals, and 10.7% had someone living alone who was 65 years of age or older. The average household size was 2.07 and the average family size was 2.54.

In the CDP, the population was spread out, with 14.8% under the age of 18, 7.7% from 18 to 24, 28.4% from 25 to 44, 31.6% from 45 to 64, and 17.4% who were 65 years of age or older. The median age was 44 years. For every 100 females, there were 121.4 males. For every 100 females age 18 and over, there were 112.9 males.

The median income for a household in the CDP was $39,063, and the median income for a family was $41,250. Males had a median income of $26,563 versus $23,636 for females. The per capita income for the CDP was $19,432. About 9.5% of families and 19.2% of the population were below the poverty line, including 21.7% of those under the age of eighteen and 19.0% of those 65 or over.

Geography
Bondurant is located at  (43.185600, −110.386251), in the Hoback Basin.

According to the United States Census Bureau, the CDP has a total area of 52.8 square miles (136.7 km2), all land.

Climate
Due to its high elevation, Bondurant experiences a subarctic climate (Köppen Dfc).

Education
Public education in the community of Bondurant is provided by Sublette County School District #1. Schools serving the community include Bondurant Elementary School (grades K-4), Pinedale Middle School (grades 5–8), and Pinedale High School (grades 9–12).

References

Census-designated places in Sublette County, Wyoming
Census-designated places in Wyoming